The Embassy of the Republic of Indonesia in Ankara is the diplomatic mission of the Republic of Indonesia to the Republic of Turkey. The embassy is currently located at 24/1 Hilal Neighbourhood Sukarno Street (formerly named Hollanda Street) Cankaya 06550 Ankara. Previously, it was located at 10 Prof. Dr. Aziz Sancar Street (formerly named Abdullah Cevdet Street) in Çankaya, Ankara. Indonesia also has a consulate general in Istanbul.

The first Indonesian ambassador to Turkey was Subiyakto (1959–1964). The embassy opened a year earlier in 1958 with Baharsjah as Chargés d'affaires. The current ambassador, Lalu Muhammad Iqbal, was appointed by President Joko Widodo on 7 January 2019.

See also 

 Embassy of Turkey, Jakarta
 Indonesia–Turkey relations
 List of diplomatic missions of Indonesia
 List of diplomatic missions in Turkey

References

External links 

 
 

Indonesia–Turkey relations
Ankara
Indonesia